Officer Down is the debut novel by crime writer Theresa Schwegel. It was published in 2005 by Minotaur Books and won the Edgar Award for Best First Novel.

References

2005 American novels
American crime novels
2005 debut novels
Minotaur Books books